Chrysillini is a tribe of jumping spider in the family Salticidae. In Maddison's 2015 revision of the family, the subfamily Heliophaninae was reclassified as a junior synonym of Chrysillini.

Genera 

 Afraflacilla 
 Augustaea 
 Chrysilla 
 Cosmophasis 
 Echinussa 
 Epocilla 
 Festucula 
 Hakka 
 Helicius 
 Heliophanillus
 Heliophanus 
 Helvetia 
 Icius 
 Kupiuka 
 Marchena 
 Matagaia 
 Menemerus 
 Mexcala 
 Natta
 Ogdenia 
 Orsima
 Paraheliophanus 
 Phintella 
 Plesiopiuka 
 Siler 
 Tasa 
 Theriella 
 Wesolowskana
 Yepoella

References 

Salticidae
Spider tribes